Route 240 or Highway 240 may refer to:

Australia
  Wimmera Highway

Canada
 Manitoba Provincial Road 240
 Prince Edward Island Route 240
 Saskatchewan Highway 240

Costa Rica
 National Route 240

Japan
 Japan National Route 240

United States
 Interstate 240
 U.S. Route 240 (former)
 California State Route 240 (former)
 Florida State Road 240 (former)
 Georgia State Route 240
Hawaii Route 240
 Indiana State Road 240
Kentucky Route 240
 Massachusetts Route 240
 Minnesota State Highway 240 (former)
 Missouri Route 240
 Montana Secondary Highway 240
 New Mexico State Road 240
 New York State Route 240
 Oregon Route 240
 Pennsylvania Route 240
 South Dakota Highway 240
 Tennessee State Route 240
 Texas State Highway 240
 Texas State Highway Loop 240
 Texas State Highway Spur 240
 Utah State Route 240
 Virginia State Route 240
 Washington State Route 240
 Wyoming Highway 240